Gabriel Araújo Marins Rodrigues (born March 20, 1996), better known by the stage name Biel, is a Brazilian singer. After achieving online success, he was signed to Warner Music in April 2015. He released his EP Biel and had a string of hits, winning Meus Prêmios Nick Award as a "Revelação Musical" (musical revelation) of the year. He released his album Juntos Vamos Além in 2016.

Career
Gabriel was born in Lorena, São Paulo. He is the eldest son of Sérgio Ricardo Marins Rodrigues and of lawyer and former DJ Eliziane Silva Araújo.

At 12, he began to show interest in a musical career and became a model, DJ and dancer. At 16, he performed as MC Biel in clubs. In 2013, Biel, he started as an independent funk carioca artist in the styles "funk ostentação" and "funk sedução" and was often dubbed a "Brazilian Justin Bieber". In 2014, he found internet blog series WeBiel. Once signed to Warner Music in 2015, he removed MC from his stage name, to perform funk and pop music under the mononym Biel. The single "Demorô" from his self-titled EP Biel became a commercial success followed up by an even more successful single "Química" also from Biel. His studio album Juntos Vamos Além is released in April 2016 on Warner.

Discography

Albums
2016: Juntos Vamos Além

EPs
2015: Biel

Singles

Filmography
2014–present:  (personal web blog series)

Awards and nominations

References

External links
Official website

1995 births
Living people
Musicians from São Paulo (state)
21st-century Brazilian male singers
21st-century Brazilian singers
Brazilian pop singers
Funk carioca musicians
People from Lorena, São Paulo